Sfera (meaning sphere) is a series of Soviet geodetic satellites.

Launches 

18 satellites were launched from 1968 to 1978, with only one failure.

See also
 Satellite geodesy
 Geo-IK-2
 List of Kosmos satellites (1–250)
 List of Kosmos satellites (251–500)
 List of Kosmos satellites (501–750)
 List of Kosmos satellites (751–1000)
 List of Kosmos satellites (1001–1250)

References

External links 
 Sfera (11F621), Gunter's Space Page
 Sfera, Encyclopedia Astronautica
 Sfera geodesic satellite, www.russianspaceweb.com

Earth observation satellites of the Soviet Union
Satellites using the KAUR bus
Kosmos satellites
Geodetic satellites